The fifth series of Love Island began airing on 3 June 2019 on ITV2, and concluded on 29 July 2019. Caroline Flack presented the series, while Iain Stirling narrated it. It is the fifth from the current revived series, but seventh overall. Singer Craig David made a cameo appearance at a Ministry of Sound pool party as a DJ performing his new single "When You Know What Love Is".

On 29 July 2019, the series was won by Amber Gill and Greg O'Shea having received 48.82% of the final vote. Molly-Mae Hague and Tommy Fury finished as runners-up.

Series five is the highest-rated series ever; with a series average of 5.61 million viewers, up 1.65 million on the previous 2018 series.

Production
During the final of the previous series on 30 July 2018, it was confirmed that Love Island would return for a fifth series due to air the following year. The first 10-second trailer for the series was released on 20 May 2019, featuring "#DayDotIsComing" and confirming the new start date. This was the first series not to feature "Love Island: The Weekly Hotlist" which previously aired on a Saturday featuring highlights from that week. Instead, it was replaced by "Love Island: Unseen Bits".

On 22 May 2019, ITV released a statement which outlined the duty of care processes ahead of series following the suicides of former contestants Sophie Gradon and Mike Thalassitis. It highlights the care offered before, during and after the series for each of the contestants. The programme announced that they will offer counselling to all contestants in hopes of preventing further incidents that regard the mental welfare of contestants.

In December, it was announced that Caroline Flack would not return. This series marked the last since its revival in 2015 to be hosted by Flack.

Islanders
The Islanders for the fifth series were released on 27 May 2019, just one week before the launch. However, throughout the series, more islanders entered the villa to find love. On 11 June 2019, it was announced that Sherif Lanre had been removed from the villa due to "breaking villa rules". Lanre later said, "I feel that the people in charge of the show have an unconscious bias around the regulations for boys and girls, and maybe different races.” On 9 July 2019, it was announced that Amy Hart decided to leave the villa due to "personal reasons". After being dumped by "half boyfriend" Curtis, she said she knew she could not find love again while in the villa.  The series was won by Amber Gill and Greg O'Shea having received 48.82% of the final vote.

Coupling
The first couples were chosen shortly after the contestants entered the villa. After all of the girls entered, the boys were asked to choose a girl to pair up with. Anton was paired with Amy, Callum with Amber, Joe and Lucie paired up, Michael and Yewande coupled up, and Sherif paired up with Anna. Curtis and Tommy then entered the villa and were told they would be stealing a girl each the following day.

Notes

 : Curtis and Tommy arrived after the coupling on Day 1, but were told they would be able to steal girls for themselves on Day 2. Curtis chose Amy, and Tommy picked Lucie.
 : Original Islanders were only given the option to remain in their current couple, or re-couple with one of the new Islanders.

Weekly summary
The main events in the Love Island villa are summarised in the table below.

Ratings
Official ratings are taken from BARB and include ITV2 +1. For the first time, catch-up service totals are added to the official ratings. Because the Saturday episodes are weekly catch-up episodes rather than nightly highlights, these are not included in the overall averages.

Controversies
After the announcement by ITV that The Jeremy Kyle Show had been cancelled following the suicide of guest Steve Dymond, there were calls for Love Island to be cancelled as well. The reasoning behind this being the suicides of former contestants, Sophie Gradon and Mike Thalassitis, as well as the show's negative portrayal of body image.

Some of the contestants, including Tommy Fury and Maura Higgins, have been criticised for their use of offensive language on their past social media posts. Higgins has also been denounced by viewers for making unwanted sexual advances toward Fury, including the use of the term 'fanny flutters'. Regulator Ofcom received 486 complaints regarding the unwanted sexual advances made by Higgins toward Fury. A further 302 complaints were made to Ofcom about Lucie Donlan's treatment from other contestants including partner Joe Garratt and fellow islander Amy Hart after signs of gaslighting and bullying being reported respectively. A total of 1,215 complaints to Ofcom were submitted between 14 and 18 June.

Sherif Lanre's removal
On 11 June 2019, it was announced that contestant Sherif Lanre had been removed from the villa due to "breaking the rules" however no further explanation was given, and his exit was not shown on screen. It was since speculated that the producers were trying to keep details of his removal under wraps to avoid further scandal.

References

2019 British television seasons
Love Island (2015 TV series)